Frederick Mark Taylor known as Tim Taylor (18 March 1888 – 2 March 1966) was a rugby union fly half who played 294 games for Leicester Tigers between 1907–1923 and once for England in 1914.

Taylor made his Leicester debut on 5 October 1907 at Welford Road against Manchester in a 32-6 win for Leicester.  Taylor also played the next match against Bristol but did not feature again in the 1907/08 season.  For the next two season's Taylor was the back up to Tigers captain Jamie Watson before forcing Watson to centre in the second half of the 1909/10 season. Taylor started the Midlands Counties Cup final in 1910 against Coventry which Leicester won.  Taylor also played as Leicester won the cup in 1912 and 1913.

Taylor formed a long lasting half back partnership with Pedlar Wood playing 188 games together for Leicester, this is the third most selected half back partnership in the club's history.

Taylor played his only international for England on 17 January 1914 against Wales at Twickenham.  Taylor played with his regular Leicester partner Wood and despite winning the game both players were dropped for the next game in the 1914 Five Nations Championship against Scotland.

Sources
Farmer,Stuart & Hands, David Tigers-Official History of Leicester Football Club (The Rugby DevelopmentFoundation )

References

1888 births
1966 deaths
English rugby union players
England international rugby union players
Rugby union players from Leicester
Rugby union fly-halves
Leicester Tigers players